Intel Parallel Building Blocks (PBB) was a collection of three programming solutions designed for multithreaded parallel computing. PBB consisted of Cilk Plus, Threading Building Blocks (TBB) and Intel Array Building Blocks (ArBB).

See also 
 Intel Parallel Studio
 Intel Concurrent Collections (CnC)
 Intel Developer Zone (Intel DZ; support and discussion)

References

External links
 

Concurrent programming languages
C programming language family
Parallel Building Blocks